is a Japanese shogi-themed manga series written and illustrated by Mitsuharu Yanamoto. It has been serialized in Shogakukan's shōnen manga magazine Weekly Shōnen Sunday since May 2020, with its chapters collected in nine tankōbon volumes as of September 2022.

Publication
The series began in Shogakukan's Weekly Shōnen Sunday on May 20, 2020. Shogakukan has collected is chapters into individual tankōbon volumes. The first volume was released on August 18, 2020, with a promotional video posted on the same day. As of September 15, 2022, nine volumes have been released.

Volume list

Reception
The series ranked 37th on the 2022 "Book of the Year" list by Da Vinci magazine.

See also
Hibiki: Shōsetsuka ni Naru Hōhō, another manga series by the same author

References

Further reading

External links
 

Shogakukan manga
Shogi in anime and manga
Shōnen manga